Sinbad: Beyond the Veil of Mists is a 2000 Indian-American animated film. It is the first feature-length computer animation film created exclusively using motion capture. While many animators worked on the project, the human characters were entirely animated using motion capture. It was filmed at Raleigh Studios in Los Angeles, over a three-month period in 1997. The film was produced by Pentafour Software, now known as Pentamedia Graphics.

Along with Pandavas: The Five Warriors (2000), this was one of the first full-length computer-graphics-based features made in India.

Plot
Sinbad discovers a mysterious island ruled by King Chandra and his daughter, Princess Serena. Serena is on her voyage beyond the "Veil of Mists". She seeks the help of Sinbad and his crew as they set out in search of the magic potion to save King Chandra from the evil clutches of the mysterious sorcerer Baraka. Their adventures with deep-sea monsters, pre-historic bats and the fish people in the land beyond the Veil of Mists, fills this action packed adventure film.

Cast
 Brendan Fraser as Sinbad
 John Rhys-Davies as King Chandra
 Jennifer Hale as Princess Serena
 Leonard Nimoy as Baraka
 Mark Hamill as Captain of the Guards
 Robert Allen Mukes as King's guard / Executioner
 Harry Zinn as Lead guard
 K.W. Miller as Babu
 Clint Carmichael as Guard
 Alice Amter as Bar wench
 Jeff Wolverton as Miscellaneous crew
 Allan Lurie as Baraka's brother
 Jim Cummings as Calico Jack
 Nick Jameson as Mook
 Kevin Michael Richardson as Mustafa

Production
Sinbad: Beyond the Veil of Mists was billed as "the first full-length animated feature using the 3-D animated motion capture process". The film used different actors for the motion caption of the main characters based on their particular size and body shape, as well as another set of actors for the facial movements. A couple of hundred animators in Madras, India, worked on the animation, as well as a smaller group in Los Angeles.

Produced by Pentamedia Graphics and Improvision Corporation with assistance of Pentafour Software and Madras. It was purchased by Trimark Pictures for television distribution and had a limited theatrical release in Los Angeles, New York and Chicago. The motion capture technology was provided by the House of Moves Motion Capture Studios in Los Angeles.

Box office
The film grossed $29,245 domestically.

See also
 List of computer-animated films

References

External links
 
 
 
 

Films based on Sinbad the Sailor
2000 films
2000 animated films
2000s fantasy adventure films
Animated adventure films
American animated fantasy films
American children's animated films
American children's fantasy films
American fantasy adventure films
Indian animated fantasy films
Indian computer-animated films
2000s English-language films
Films directed by Alan Jacobs
2000 computer-animated films
Films using motion capture
2000s American animated films
Trimark Pictures films
English-language Indian films
2000s children's animated films
2000s children's fantasy films